Diego Gómez de Lamadrid, O.SS.T. (1529 – August 15, 1601) was a Roman Catholic prelate who served as Archbishop of Badajoz (1578–1601) and then second Archbishop of Lima (1577–1578).

Biography
Diego Gómez de Lamadrid was born in  Potes Spain and ordained a priest in then Trinitarian Order. On March 27, 1577, Pope Gregory XIII, appointed him then second Archbishop of Lima replacing Jerónimo de Loayza. On June 13, 1577, Pope Gregory XIII, appointed him as Archbishop (personal title) of then Diocese of Badajoz where he served until his death on August 15, 1601. His successor in Lima was Saint Turibius de Mogrovejo.

References

External links and additional sources
 (for Chronology of Bishops) 
 (for Chronology of Bishops) 
 (for Chronology of Bishops) 
 (for Chronology of Bishops) 

1529 births
1601 deaths
Bishops appointed by Pope Gregory XIII
Trinitarian bishops
University of Salamanca alumni
People from Cantabria
Roman Catholic archbishops of Lima